This is a list of the vice-admirals of Leinster, a province in mid-Ireland.

Prior to 1585 the whole of Ireland was served by a single vice-admiral, namely Thomas Radcliffe, 3rd Earl of Sussex (1558–1565), Gerald Fitzgerald, 11th Earl of Kildare (1564–1573) and Thomas Butler, 10th Earl of Ormonde (1585). Separate vice-admiralties were then established for Munster in 1585, for Ulster by 1602, for Leinster by 1612 and for Connaught by 1615.

Vice-admirals of Leinster
Source (1612–1660) 

Source (1661–):

 1585–1612 no appointment known
 1612–1614 Thomas Butler, 10th Earl of Ormonde
 1614–1625 no appointment known
 1625–1635 Adam Loftus, 1st Viscount Loftus
 1635 Sir Robert Loftus
 1640 Sir George Wentworth
 1640–1647 no appointment known
 1647– Sir Arthur Loftus
 1647–1660 no appointment known
 1660–1667? Sir George Wentworth
 1668–1689 Hon. Carey Dillon
 1691 Henry Wallop
 1692–1701 John Granville, 1st Earl of Bath
 1702 John Granville
 1708–1710 Philip Savage
 1710 John Allen
 1711–1714 Philip Savage (died 1717)
 1714–1728 Richard Fitzwilliam, 5th Viscount Fitzwilliam
 1728–1776 Richard FitzWilliam, 6th Viscount FitzWilliam
 1777–1816 Richard FitzWilliam, 7th Viscount FitzWilliam  
 1822–1838 James Wandesford Butler, 19th Earl of Ormonde
 <1847–1874 Sir Thomas St Lawrence, 3rd Earl of Howth
 1874-1892 Henry Moore, 3rd Marquess of Drogheda

References

Military ranks of the United Kingdom
Vice-Admirals
Leinster